Penthouse Paupers were an Australian rock band from Melbourne that was active in the 1980s.

They released one album, Penthouse Paupers, in 1987 on the Grown Up Wrong label. It reached #9 in the Indie charts. The following year they released a single Same Place Twice that reached #11 on the Indie charts.

The group name may have been inspired by Penthouse Pauper, a 1969 track by Creedence Clearwater Revival.

Contemporaries in the Melbourne music scene included the Huxton Creepers, Painters and Dockers, the Cracked Jaffers and the Puritans.  They performed close to 200 gigs over five years, including headlining at Melbourne venues such as the Punters Club, the Prince of Wales, the Palace, the Esplanade Hotel and the Club. The Paupers also shared the bill with The Troggs, Hunters and Collectors, Screaming Tribesmen, and TISM. 

Ian Collard went on to play with blues-rock bands Backsliders and Three Kings.

Members

 Mick Collopy — lead vocals, guitar
 Jeremy Hart — guitar
 Richard Collopy — drums, vocals
 Hamish Hardy — bass, vocals
 Ian Collard — harmonica
 Chris Boyce — keyboard

Discography

EPs/Singles
 Penthouse Paupers - Grown Up Wrong (WRONG 2) (1987)
 "Same Place Twice"/"Snake Charm" - Grown Up Wrong (WRONG 11) (1988)

Further reading
 NVD Records

References 

Australian rock music groups
Victoria (Australia) musical groups